The Chongqing Municipal People's Congress is Chongqing's local legislature within the People's Republic of China. The Congress is elected for a term of five years. Chongqing Municipal People's Congress meetings are held at least once a year in the Great Hall of the People. After a proposal by more than one-fifth of the deputies, a meeting of the people's congress at the corresponding level may be convened temporarily.

Powers and duties 

 Ensure the compliance and implementation of the Constitution, laws, administrative regulations, and the resolutions of the higher people's congress and its standing committee, and ensure the implementation of the national plan and national budget
 Review and approve the national economic and social development plans, budgets and report on their implementation
 Discuss and decide on major issues related to politics, economy, education, science, culture, health, environment and resource protection, civil affairs, ethnicity, etc...
 Elect of the members of the Standing Committee of the Chongqing People's Congress
 Election of governor, deputy governor, chairman and vice chairman of autonomous region, mayor, deputy mayor, governor, deputy governor, county governor, deputy governor, district governor, deputy governor
 Election of the president of the people's court and the Chief Procurator of the People's Procuratorate at the same level; the elected Chief Procurator of the People's Procuratorate must be reported to the Chief Procurator of the People's Procuratorate at a higher level for approval by the Standing Committee of the Chongqing People's Congress
 Election of deputies to the people's congress at a higher level
 Listen to and review the work reports of the Standing Committee of the Chongqing People's Congress
 Hear and review the work reports of the people's government, people's courts, and people's procuratorates
 Change or revoke inappropriate resolutions of the Standing Committee of the Chongqing People's Congress
 Revoke inappropriate decisions and orders of the people's government at the same level
 Protect the socialist property owned by the whole people and collectively owned by the working people, protect the legal private property of citizens, maintain social order, and protect citizens' personal rights, democratic rights and other rights
 Protect the legitimate rights and interests of various economic organizations
 Protect the rights of ethnic minorities
 Guarantee the rights of equality between men and women, equal pay for equal work and freedom of marriage granted to women by the Constitution and laws

Directors 

 Wang Yunlong (王云龙): 1997－2002
 Huang Zhendong (黄镇东): 2003－2007
 Chen Guangguo (陈光国): 2008－2012
 Zhang Xuan (张轩): 2013－present

See also 

 Politics of Chongqing

References 

Politics of Chongqing